Croatia Songs is a record chart in Croatia for songs, compiled by Billboard since February 2022. The chart is updated every Tuesday on Billboards website. The chart was announced on 14 February 2022 as part of Billboards Hits of the World chart collection. 

The first number-one song on the chart was "Behute" by Senidah on the issue dated 19 February 2022. The chart's current number-one song is "S.O.S." by Jala Brat and Buba Corelli.

Methodology 
The chart tracks songs' performance from Friday to Thursday. Chart rankings are based on digital downloads from full-service digital music retailers (sales from direct-to-consumer sites such as an individual artist's store are excluded) and online streaming occurred in Croatia during the tracking period. All data are provided by MRC Data.

List of number-one songs

Reception 
All songs that appeared on the first issue of the chart were released by the former Yugoslav non-Croatian musicians, apart from "Trebaš li me" by Eni Jurišić and Matija Cvek, "Debili" by 30zona and Kuku$ Klan, "Ti i ja" by Jelena Rozga (in collaboration with Serbian singer Saša Matić), and "Highlife" by Grše, alongside "Heat Waves" by Glass Animals and "Black Summer" by Red Hot Chili Peppers. Hrvoje Marjanović of Index.hr criticized the Croatian media for trying to censor mainstream music from other former Yugoslav republics due to its alleged lack of quality, and praised the chart for showcasing what people of Croatia actually listen to. He further praised the death of genre boundaries, claiming that, "on the same IG story of the same person, probably in the same day, you will come across songs by Arctic Monkeys, Drake and Senidah", as well as the death of the "cajka problem".

Croatian music journalists generally reacted positively to the introduction of such a music chart but criticized the local music industry managers for trying to cover up the popularity of trap music. Tena Šarčević of Jutarnji list explained how the lack of Croatian artists might shock some people, but that the Balkan trap genre has been ruling on-demand streaming for quite some time. She further noted how there's a big difference between the Croatian airplay-based HR Top 40 chart, and the Billboard chart. Ravno Do Dnas Zoran Stajčić commented how the newly introduced Billboard chart is "real" and how it gives real insight into popularity of a song, comparing it to "waking up from the matrix". Goran Komerički, one of the Croatian Airplay Radio Chart editors, reacted positively to the introduction of the chart and compared the situation with Balkan artists not getting airplay with the song "We Don't Talk About Bruno" not being fully embraced by US radio. Boris Dežulović satirized the censorship that the music from the chart is facing on the Croatian radio by drawing comparisons between it and Croatian nationalism, linguistic purism, and Independence War propaganda.

Croatian music managers did not comment on the small amount of Croatian acts charting on the Croatia Songs chart and explained how the chart will help with promoting local music to foreign markets. The CEO of the Croatian Discography Association (HDU), Dario Draštata noted how the HDU is "extremely glad that Croatia has been recognized by Billboard as an important market on the global music map". The president of the Regional Association of Independent Discographers (RUNDA) explained how the chart "is great for business development and allows our performers and their publishers an easier way to recognition of their work outside of Croatia and the [Balkan] region".

References 

Croatia Songs
Croatian music industry